Marie-Christine Ventrillon is a French Olympic archer. She represented her country in the women's individual competition at the 1976 Summer Olympics. She came 17th place after both rounds, finishing with 2298 points.

References

1949 births
Living people
French female archers
Olympic archers of France
Archers at the 1976 Summer Olympics